Crocus vallicola  is a species of flowering plant in the genus Crocus of the family Iridaceae. It is a cormous perennial native to north eastern Turkey to the western Caucasus.

References

vallicola